Colour banding is a subtle form of posterization in digital images, caused by the colour of each pixel being rounded to the nearest of the digital colour levels. While posterization is often done for artistic effect, colour banding is an undesired artifact. In 24-bit colour modes, 8 bits per channel is usually considered sufficient to render images in Rec. 709 or sRGB. However the eye can see the difference between the colour levels, especially when there is a sharp border between two large areas of adjacent color levels. This will happen with gradual gradients (like sunsets, dawns or clear blue skies), and also when blurring an image a large amount.

Colour banding is more noticeable with fewer bits per pixel (BPP) at 16–256 colours (4–8 BPP), where there are fewer shades with a larger difference between them.

Possible solutions include the introduction of dithering and increasing the number of bits per colour channel.

Because the banding comes from limitations in the presentation of the image, blurring the image does not fix this.

See also
 Posterization
 Quantization (signal processing)

External links
Dynamic range 24 vs 36 bit 

Computer graphics
Computer graphic artifacts
Visual artifacts